Olivella poppei is a species of small sea snail, marine gastropod mollusk in the subfamily Olivellinae, in the family Olividae, the olives.  Species in the genus Olivella are commonly called dwarf olives.

Description
The length of the shell attains 10.2 mm.

Distribution
This marine species occurs off Japan.

References

External links
 MNHN, Paris: holotype

poppei
Gastropods described in 1998